Wuquan (Chinese: 五權車站; pinyin: Wǔquán Chēzhàn) is a railway station located in South District, Taichung, Taiwan. It is owned by the Taiwan Railways Administration and is on the Taichung Line. It opened on October 28, 2018. The station is categorized as a B-class local station and is served by local trains only. 

The name means "five powers" is derived from nearby Wuquan Road, which references Taiwan's five branches of government.

Location 
Wuquan station is located at the intersection between Jianguo and Sanmin Roads. It is located near the National Library of Public Information and the Taichung Courthouse.

References 

2018 establishments in Taiwan
Railway stations in Taichung
Railway stations opened in 2018
Railway stations served by Taiwan Railways Administration